8/9 may refer to:
August 9 (month-day date notation)
September 8 (day-month date notation)